Cecilia Nilsson may refer to:

 Cecilia Nilsson (orienteer), Swedish orienteering competitor
 Cecilia Nilsson (athlete) (born 1979), Swedish retired hammer thrower
 Cecilia Nilsson (actress) (born 1957), Swedish actress